Cross of Liberty may refer to:
Order of the Cross of Liberty (Finland)
Cross of Liberty (Estonia)